The Abbot of Soulseat was the head of the Premonstratensian (originally Cistercian) monastic community of Soulseat Abbey in Galloway. The following is a list of abbots and commendators:

List of Cistercian abbots
 Michael of Bangor, fl. c. 1148

List of Premonstratensian abbots
 Michael of Bangor<ref>Recorded in the Obituary of Prémontré as the "first abbot of our abbots in Galloway". Probably refers to the same Michael.</ref>
 None of the abbots before 1273 known by name John, 1273
 More than a century with no known abbot Fionnlagh (Finlay), 1386-1393
 Patrick McChaquhirky, 1452-1458
 Gilbert MacUlnan (MacWilnane), 1458-1464 x 1486
 Patrick MacCulloch    1486
 Quentin Vaus    1493-1527
 David Vaus    1525-1532

List of commendators
 James Johnstone of Wamphray, 1532-1545/6
 John Johnstone I,    1545-1567
 Opposed by James Kennedy, 1548, 1555
 John Johnstone II, 1584-1598
 John Kennedy, 1598
 John Johnstone III, 1599
 William Adair, 1601
 John Hamilton, 1612-1630

Notes

Bibliography
 Watt, D.E.R. & Shead, N.F. (eds.), The Heads of Religious Houses in Scotland from the 12th to the 16th Centuries'', The Scottish Records Society, New Series, Volume 24, (Edinburgh, 2001), p. 204-6

See also
 Soulseat Abbey

Cistercian abbots by monastery
Premonstratensians
Scottish abbots